Procyclic may refer to:
 a term related to the profinite groups in mathematics
 Procyclic life stage, a life stage of the Trypanosoma parasite in African trypanosomiasis
 Procyclical and countercyclical are terms used to describe how an economic quantity is related to economic fluctuations.